Internet-in-a-Box is a low cost digital library, consisting of a wireless access point with storage, which users nearby can connect to.

Its realization in hardware and software has changed since 2012, as miniaturization of storage space and electronics progressed. As of 2017, its hardware may consist of a Raspberry Pi with a replaceable storage card.

In 2016, Columbia University's Masters in Public Administration in Development Practice (MPA-DP) explored using these boxes in the Dominican Republic for three months.

Digital library
The digital library is composed of multiple modules; modules may be pre-installed, or users may choose which to install. Examples of modules include Wikipedia in a specific language, Wikipedia's Medical Encyclopedia, Khan Academy Lite, and OpenStreetMap. Other content includes Moodle, Nextcloud, MediaWiki, PhET (interactive mathematics and science simulations), TED Talks.

History
The concept grew out of One Laptop per Child's school server project.

See also 
 Internet-in-a-Box.org
 Project updates
 Software repository
 Community tech docs
 Frequently Asked Questions
 Meta: Internet-in-a-Box
 Kiwix
 Afripedia Project
 Related: PirateBox alternatives, NetHood

References

Educational technology non-profits
Information and communication technologies for development
Digital library projects